Ezzatabad (also Romanized as ‘Ezzatābād) is a village in Qarah Quyun-e Shomali Rural District, in the Central District of Showt County, West Azerbaijan Province, Iran. At the 2006 census, its population was 97, in 21 families.

References 

Populated places in Showt County